Jérémie Palmigiani, better known by his stage name Soul Machine, is a French electronic music producer and an electronic instrument designer.
He has worked as a solo electronic musician and as a remixer for artists such as Yann Destal (Modjo), Nyls or Missill.

Music
He started DJing and producing music under the name of Soul Machine in 2009. The French radio Radio Metal invited him to their "High Hopes" show of December 2010 after he released a non-official remix of the song "Blackened" by Metallica.

In 2012, the French DJ Girl Missill asks him to produce some tracks for her upcoming album and a remix of her single "Champions" in collaboration with the American hip hop duo M.O.P. and the British MC Dynamite MC.

He composes in 2013 the soundtrack of a documentary directed in Fukushima by the charity/fashion project "Silk Me Back in Japan".
 
In parallel, the Franco-Italian singer Nyls, asks him to remix his single "Crazy".
The remix is featured in the Soundtrack of the movie "Yellow" directed by Rene Zhang the following year.

In 2014, Yann Destal, singer of Modjo, calls him to remix his single "Walk With Me".
Soul Machine releases the same year a double EP Phanerosphene I&II on So French Records, with an art cover painted by the Arizonian Psychedelic artist Jeff Hopp. The Artwork will later be featured in the painter's Comic book "Legend of the Mind - A Philip K. Dick Tribute".

He releases in 2015 the song "Wonderkids" co-produced with the Czech producer Atrey. The EP "Wonderkids Remixes" is released the following year featuring remixers such as Superfunk or Mozambo.
Soul Machine releases in 2020 the song "Wicked Desire" featuring the american singer Krissy Abshire and remixes from Atrey, Bastion and Kn1ghT.

In 2021, his remix of Jayce and the Wheeled Warriors becomes the introduction theme of the Protean Ramblings retro Podcast.

Instruments design
In 2018, Soul Machine introduces his own handmade Electronic instruments under the name of "Far Beyond Perception".

The MS-X, an Analog synthesizer, is a modified Korg Monotron inspired by the Korg MS-10.

The Psylotron is a hybrid replica of the Mellotron M400.

Discography

Singles: 

EPs: 

Official Remixes:

References

French electronic musicians
Year of birth missing (living people)
Living people